Klaudia Schifferle (born September 22, 1955, in Zürich) is a Swiss painter and musician. Schifferle is a previous member of the all women punk group Kleenex.

As of 2021 she is in the band ONETWOTHREE with Madlaina Peer and Sara Schär. All three play bass, and their record was released by Kill Rock Stars in October 2021.

References

This article was initially translated from the German Wikipedia.

20th-century Swiss painters
21st-century Swiss painters
1955 births
Living people

Women in punk